Charles W. Hunt (January 2, 1864 – August 16, 1938) was an Iowa politician who served as the chair of the Federal Trade Commission from December 1, 1926 to November 30, 1927, and again from January 1, 1931 to December 31, 1931.

Born in Logan, Iowa, Hunt received an undergraduate degree from Iowa State University in 1888, and worked for a time as a teacher and a farmer. In 1911, Hunt was elected as a Republican to represent Harrison County, Iowa, in the Thirty-fourth and Thirty-fifth sessions of the Iowa General Assembly, in the Iowa House of Representatives, serving until 1915. He held various other state offices and trade organization positions until 1924, when President Calvin Coolidge appointed Hunt to a seat on the FTC vacated by the resignation of Victor Murdock.

Hunt's reappointment was contested in the Senate, where Senator William H. King of Utah objected, asserting "that Hunt was a reactionary and was not enforcing the law". After several weeks of delay, Hunt was reconfirmed. Hunt retired from the FTC in 1932, and remained in Washington, D.C., until his death, at the age of 74.

References

Federal Trade Commission personnel
1864 births
1938 deaths
People from Logan, Iowa
Iowa State University alumni
Republican Party members of the Iowa House of Representatives